Fesi or FeSi may refer to
Eden Fesi, a fictional, mutant superhero appearing in Marvel Comics
Mike Fesi (born 1959), American politician and businessman 
Iron monosilicide, a chemical compound with the formula FeSi
Naquite, a mineral with the chemical formula FeSi